Mathew Jansen Batsiua (born 27 May 1971) is a Nauruan politician. Batsiua, a former health minister and former foreign minister of Nauru, has served as a member of parliament for the constituency of Boe since 2004.

Parliamentary role

Batsiua has been elected to parliament in the 2004 general elections, ousting long-time parliamentarian and former president Kinza Clodumar. He has been re-elected in the 2007 and 2008 elections.

He was Minister of Finance in the cabinet of Marcus Stephen from July 2011 to November 2011. He was appointed as Minister Assisting the President of Nauru in the short-lived cabinet of Frederick Pitcher in November 2011.

Parliamentary constituency

He represents the Boe Constituency in the Parliament of Nauru.

Background

Before entering parliament, Batsiua previously served as chief secretary.

See also

 Politics of Nauru
 Elections in Nauru
 2008 Nauruan parliamentary election

References

1971 births
Living people
Finance Ministers of Nauru
Foreign Ministers of Nauru
Members of the Parliament of Nauru
People from Boe District
Ministers Assisting the President of Nauru
Nauruan civil servants
21st-century Nauruan politicians